Hippocephala fuscostriata is a species of beetle in the family Cerambycidae. It was described by Breuning in 1940. It is reported from Bhutan.

References

Agapanthiini
Beetles described in 1940
Taxa named by Stephan von Breuning (entomologist)